"Death Picks Cotton" is the fifth episode of King of the Hill's twelfth season, and originally aired on November 11, 2007. The episode features the death of Hank's father, Cotton Hill. The episode aired on Veterans Day.

Plot
Hank and the guys are building a new shed, since Dale had blown up Hank's old shed. Cotton shows up and kicks the shed down in disapproval over it not being as good as the one he built back in World War II. Lucky and Luanne are talking about a restaurant, a teppanyaki steakhouse à la Benihana, where they are planning on eating that night. Bobby isn't allowed to go since the night out is for adults only, and Cotton volunteers to stay and watch Bobby. Peggy leaves Bobby a lasagna in the fridge to heat up for dinner later; Cotton refuses to eat the lasagna cold but will neither allow Bobby to heat it up nor do it himself, since they are both men. Cotton instead drives Bobby (at night, without glasses or a license, and using a mop to reach the pedals) to the restaurant to join his family for dinner.

They arrive at the restaurant, but Cotton doesn't want anything to do with it since the restaurant is Japanese. He gets into an altercation with the chef at their table, even though the chef only speaks Spanish, and winds up in the hospital after falling on the grill and burning himself. The doctors don't think Cotton is going to make it, and Hank refuses to believe them. He goes home to rebuild the shed his father knocked down. Dale visits Cotton in the hospital and learns that Cotton's last wish is to knock down Hank's shed one more time. Lucky and Luanne take Bobby in while Cotton is in the hospital so that they can practice being parents. It doesn't go well. Dale tries to knock down Hank's shed, but only hurts his shoulder. Hank wants to know what he's doing and Dale tells him about his father's last wish. Hank realizes that if his father is making a last wish then he must really be dying, so Hank heads to the hospital where he tells his father he loves him. Cotton taunts him for this, so Hank tells him he does not love him. Just then, Cotton flatlines and Hank rushes out of the room just as the doctors rush in to work on their coding patient.

Back home, Peggy is telling Hank that it's okay because Cotton had made his life hell when they get a call from the hospital informing them that Cotton is still alive, which offers Hank a second chance to tell his father that he does love him. When Hank tries, however, Cotton flips out on him and Hank leaves the room. Peggy then gives Cotton a piece of her mind and tells him she will no longer put up with his rude and selfish behavior (Peggy loosely implies that she and Hank plan on putting him in a nursing home if he recovers from this ordeal) and that she hopes he lives forever and is always in pain. Cotton, after saying "Do ya, now?" and laughing at Peggy's statement, finally dies. Hank comes back in the room and Peggy tells him that Cotton had told her that he loved Hank before he died.

Later, back in Hank's yard, Hank places a plaque on the door of the newly rebuilt shed dedicating it to "Cotton Hill: American". Just when everyone stands back to admire the shed, Dale blows it up as a tribute to Cotton.

Cultural references
Bobby dances to The Pussycat Dolls's "Don't Cha". 
The scene where Bobby and Lucky roll down a hill in a tractor tire is a reference to an episode of Beavis and Butt-Head, another show created by Mike Judge.

References

External links
 IMDB: Death Picks Cotton

King of the Hill episodes
2007 American television episodes